Gianluca 'Luca' Percassi (born 25 August 1980 in Milan) is an Italian retired footballer.

A defender, Percassi came through the youth system at Atalanta, before signing for Chelsea as a 17-year-old, along with teammate Samuele Dalla Bona. Unlike Dalla Bona, however, he struggled to break into Chelsea's first team and only made two appearances, both as a substitute. He joined Monza on a free transfer in October 2000, and then had spells with Alzano and Spezia.

In 2004, he retired from football to enter into entrepreneurship, following his father's footsteps.

In June 2010 his father Antonio Percassi acquired football club Atalanta, the first club of Luca Percassi, from the Ruggeri family. Luca Percassi became the CEO of Atalanta.

References

1980 births
Living people
Italian footballers
Italian expatriate footballers
Italian expatriate sportspeople in England
Atalanta B.C. players
Chelsea F.C. players
A.C. Monza players
Spezia Calcio players
Association football defenders
Footballers from Milan
Virtus Bergamo Alzano Seriate 1909 players